Zivanna Letisha Siregar (born February 16, 1989) is an Indonesian talk show host, book writer, philanthropist, model and beauty pageant titleholder who won Puteri Indonesia 2008, She has a chance to represent Indonesia at Miss Universe 2009 Pageant in Atlantis Paradise Island, Nassau, Bahamas, where she didn't make into the Top 15, but she won "Miss Popularity" award.

Early life and career

Born in Jakarta, Indonesia, with the Batak and Sundanese background from her parents, She is the former winner of Elite Model Look Indonesia, and competed in Elite Model Look Asia Pacific 2006 in China. On 2007, She is finishing her High School at Al-Izhar Pondok Labu - Jakarta. She hold the Bachelor of Economics from University of Indonesia.

She is currently working as a news presenter on Indonesian TV station NET.TV and she eager to become a movie star. There have been some offers, but she has rejected them because she doesn't like the roles.

Beside work as a presenter, on 2 September 2012 Zivanna was chosen as the "Ambassador for Orangutans", visiting the Orangutan Foundation International’s - Orangutan Care Center and Quarantine in Pasir Panjang as well as Camp Leakey in Tanjung Puting National Park to publicize the plight of wild orangutan populations and their habitat, tropical rain forest, in Sumatra and Borneo. During her visit she interviewed Dr. Birute Galdikas, President of OFI, for television. Zivanna is fluent in both Indonesian and English.

Zivanna is also work as a content and book writer published by Elex Media Komputindo, known to have just completed her second book titled "Trik Juara Mengatur Waktu (Champion Trick to Set a Time)" which was released on April 22, 2016. Previously, she also released her first best selling book in 2013 "Buku Pintar Cewek Juara (Guide Book of a Woman Champion)".

On 21 February 2016, She is married to Indonesian businessman Haries Argareza Harahap in Dharmawangsa Hotel - Jakarta. and giving birth her only son, Ryoji Ibrahim Harahap in November 16, 2017. On 18 July 2018, President of Indonesia - Joko Widodo, appointed Zivanna to be a Pendet dancer, wearing traditional Balinese dress, for the opening ceremony of 2018 Asian Games torch relay in Grobogan Regency, Central Java - Indonesia.

Pageantry

Puteri Indonesia 2008
At the age of 19, Zivanna started her world of pageantry by joining the 13th edition of Puteri Indonesia beauty pageant. She represented Jakarta SCR 6 in the Puteri Indonesia 2008 pageant, and was crowned on  15 August 2008 succeeding her predecessor, Putri Raemawasti of East Java, in the Jakarta Convention Center.

Miss Universe 2009
Zivanna represented Indonesia in Miss Universe 2009 at the Atlantis Paradise Island, Nassau, the Bahamas. Zivanna was failed to place in the semifinals, but she ended won "Miss Popularity (Fan-vote)" award.

Filmography
Zivanna has presenting on several variety talk show.

Talk show

Famous relatives 
Alexander Siregar, physicist working on Cabal theory
Merari Siregar, Indonesian writer and novelist

References

External links
 
 
 Official Miss Universe Official Website
 Puteri Indonesia

Living people
1989 births
Indonesian beauty pageant winners
Indonesian television presenters
Indonesian women television presenters
Indonesian television talk show hosts
Indonesian television personalities
Indonesian journalists
Indonesian women journalists
Indonesian Muslims
People of Batak descent
Sundanese people
People from Jakarta
Puteri Indonesia winners
Miss Universe 2009 contestants
University of Indonesia alumni